Strangers is a 2007 Indian Hindi-language thriller film directed by Aanand L. Rai and starring Jimmy Sheirgill, Kay Kay Menon, Nandana Sen, Sonali Kulkarni. It is an adaptation of the 1951 Alfred Hitchcock film Strangers on a Train, which was based on the 1950 novel Strangers on a Train by Patricia Highsmith.

Synopsis
Rahul, a flop writer, and Sanjeev Rai, a management professional giant, are travelling in business class compartment of train in England from Southampton to London. The claustrophobia of closed space and fact that they both are Indians binds them in chatting. The chatting gets more and more personal and they both learn that they are not happy with their married lives. Rai is living a miserable life. After his son's death, his wife Nandini is in state of madness. Likewise, Rahul is not respected by his wife Preity after crash of his ambitious career as writer. Rahul and Sanjeev Rai come to a mutual conclusion that the only way to get out of their painful life is to kill each other's wife. But what happens actually thereafter?

Cast
Jimmy Sheirgill as "Rahul"
Kay Kay Menon as "Sanjeev Rai" 
Nandana Sen as "Preity", wife of Rahul 
Sonali Kulkarni as "Nandini Rai", wife of Sanjeev in a special appearance
Kitu Gidwani as a publisher in a guest role
Natalie Hatcher as Frances, Preity's friend
Mark Von as Peter, Frances's husband

Production
This is first film by Anand Rai as director. Earlier Anand Rai (younger brother of Ravi Rai) has worked as associate director for the 2000 Hindi film Anjaane directed by Ravi Rai. The English translation of the Hindi word "anjaane" is "strangers".

Soundtrack

References

External links 
 
Rediff review
Bollywood Hungama review

2007 films
2000s Hindi-language films
2007 psychological thriller films
Indian psychological thriller films
Films based on American novels
Films based on works by Patricia Highsmith
Indian remakes of American films
2007 directorial debut films
Films directed by Aanand L. Rai